Çakrazova is a village in the Amasra District, Bartın Province, Turkey. Its population is 160 (2021).

history 
The village has had the same name since 1928. A significant Sadz and Laz population live in the neighborhood.

References

Villages in Amasra District